The 2004 Wisconsin Badgers football team represented the University of Wisconsin–Madison during the 2004 NCAA Division I-A football season.  Led by Barry Alvarez, the Badgers completed the season with a 9–3 record, including a 6–2 mark in the Big Ten Conference, good for a third-place finish.

Schedule

Roster

Game summaries

Central Florida

UNLV

Arizona

Penn State

Illinois

#18 Ohio State

#5 Purdue

Northwestern

Minnesota

Michigan State

Iowa

#8 Georgia

Rankings

Regular starters

Players selected in the 2005 NFL Draft

References

Wisconsin
Wisconsin Badgers football seasons
Wisconsin Badgers football